Protopterus is the genus of four species of lungfish found in Africa. Protopterus is considered the sole genus in the family Protopteridae, which is sometimes grouped with Lepidosiren in the family Lepidosirenidae.

Description
African lungfishes are elongated, eel-like fishes, with thread-like pectoral and pelvic fins. They have soft scales, and the dorsal and tail fins are fused into a single structure. They can either swim like eels, or crawl along the bottom, using their pectoral and pelvic fins.

African lungfishes generally inhabit shallow waters, such as swamps and marshes. They are also found in larger lakes such as Lake Victoria. They can live out of water for many months in burrows of hardened mud beneath a dried stream bed. They are carnivorous, eating crustaceans, aquatic insect larvae, and molluscs.

Biology

The African lungfish is an example of how the evolutionary transition from breathing water to breathing air can happen. Lungfish are periodically exposed to water with low oxygen content or situations in which their aquatic environment dries up. Their adaptation for dealing with these conditions is an outpocketing of the gut, related to the swim bladder of other fishes, that serves as a lung. The lung contains many thin-walled blood vessels, so blood flowing through those vessels can pick up oxygen from air gulped into the lung.

The African lungfishes are obligate air breathers, with reduced gills in the adults. They have two anterior gill arches that retain gills, though they are too small to function as the sole respiratory apparatus. The lungfish heart has adaptations that partially separate the flow of blood into its pulmonary and systemic circuits. The atrium is partially divided, so that the left side receives oxygenated blood and the right side receives deoxygenated blood from the other tissues. These two blood streams remain mostly separate as they flow through the ventricle leading to the gill arches. As a result, oxygenated blood mostly goes to the anterior gill arches and the deoxygenated blood mostly goes to the posterior arches.

African lungfishes breed at the beginning of the rainy season. They construct nests or burrows in the mud to hold their eggs, which they then guard against predators. When they hatch, the young resemble tadpoles, with external gills, and only later develop lungs and begin to breathe air.

As food
Until the introduction of the Nile perch to the region, lungfish typically comprised a small proportion of a fisherman's catch. Transportation to market from catching sites in Lake Victoria was often done with fish sun-dried for better preservation. Human consumption of the lungfish varies by population; the Luo peoples occasionally do so but the Sukuma avoid eating lungfish due to a taste which is "locally either highly appreciated or strongly disliked." As technology advancements such as longlines and gillnets have been increasingly applied over the past 50 years, the lungfish populations there are believed to be decreasing.

Species and subspecies

The family Protopteridae and genus Protopterus contain four extant (living) species:
 
 Protopterus aethiopicus Heckel, 1851 — marbled lungfish
 P. a. aethiopicus Heckel, 1851
 P. a. congicus Poll, 1961
 P. a. mesmaekersi Poll, 1961
 Protopterus amphibius (W. K. H. Peters, 1844) — gilled African lungfish or East African lungfish
 Protopterus annectens (Owen, 1839) — West African lungfish
 P. a. annectens (Owen, 1839)
 P. a. brieni Poll, 1961 — southern lungfish
 Protopterus dolloi Boulenger, 1900 — slender lungfish or spotted African lungfish

Other extinct species are known from fossil remains:
 †Protopterus crassidens Churcher & de Iuliis 2001
 †Protopterus elongus Martin 1995
†Protopterus libycus Stromer 1910
 †Protopterus nigeriensis Martin 1997
 †Protopterus polli Dartevelle & Casier 1949
†Protopterus protopteroides Tabaste 1962
 †Protopterus regulatus Schall 1984

References

 Purves, Sadava, Orians, Heller, "Life: The Science of Biology" 7th ed. pg. 943. Courier Companies Inc: USA, 2004.

 
Lobe-finned fish genera
Taxa named by Richard Owen
Freshwater fish genera